Aiello del Friuli is a comune (municipality) in  the Italian region Friuli-Venezia Giulia, located about  northwest of Trieste and about  southeast of Udine. 

Aiello del Friuli borders the following municipalities: Bagnaria Arsa, Campolongo al Torre, Cervignano del Friuli, Ruda, San Vito al Torre, Visco.

Joannis is the birthplace of Enzo Bearzot, former Italian football player and manager, who won the 1982 FIFA World Cup as coach.

References

External links

 Official website
 http://www.ilpaesedellemeridiane.com

Cities and towns in Friuli-Venezia Giulia
Articles which contain graphical timelines